Kappa Psi Pharmaceutical Fraternity, Incorporated, is the largest professional pharmaceutical fraternity in the world with more than 6,000 student members and more than 87,000 alumni members.  It was founded in 1879 at Russell Military Academy in New Haven, Connecticut as the Society of Kappa Psi.

History
The Society of Kappa Psi was founded on 30 May 1879 at the Russell Military Academy in New Haven, Connecticut as an academic society for college preparatory schools. The Society named as its founder Franklin Harvey Smith. It quickly created an additional chapter, at the Cheshire Military Academy in Cheshire, Connecticut in 1879. While these two early units failed, another chapter formed at Hillhouse Academy of New Haven, Connecticut in 1894. Hillhouse too, died as a chapter on 30 June 1895.

But the founders of these chapters, many having graduated and entered college and still students themselves, sought a collegiate level re-establishment of the order. Representatives, now alumni without an active chapter from these three early prep school chapters formed a grand chapter called Alpha chapter on December 10, 1895, deeming it an essential step for rebuilding the fraternity and for expansion nationally.  These men, reforming the organization as Kappa Psi Fraternity chartered its first collegiate chapter, Delta, at the University of Maryland in the fall of 1898 when former members of the Hillhouse chapter entered that school in the study of medicine. Others, who had opted for the study of pharmacy, formed a Gamma chapter at the College of Pharmacy at Columbia University in that same year.  A third group of advancing students formed the Beta chapter at the University College of Medicine in Richmond, Virginia, in 1900.

By 1902 the young organization had formed six chapters and already held four conventions. In 1903 the Society incorporated as a national fraternity, operating jointly as both a medical and pharmaceutical fraternity.

By mutual agreement, in 1924, the fraternity split into Kappa Psi, which retained its pharmacy component, and Theta Kappa Psi, which became strictly a medical fraternity. Theta Kappa Psi later struggled; it would go on to merge with Phi Beta Pi in 1961, but this union was again dissolved in 1992. A single chapter carries on the Theta Kappa Psi name today.

Kappa Psi Fraternity would later incorporate under the name of Kappa Psi Pharmaceutical Fraternity.

In 1977, Kappa Psi first welcomed women into the fraternity.

Today there are 111 active collegiate chapters and 75 graduate chapters across the United States, Canada, and the Bahamas, and over 80,000 people have been initiated into the fraternity since its inception.

The Central Office of Kappa Psi is located in Richardson, Texas.

Provinces
Nationally, Kappa Psi is divided into eleven provinces, which the majority meet biannually and is divided as follows:
Atlantic Province - Chapters in Georgia, North Carolina, South Carolina, Tennessee, and Virginia.
Great Lakes Province - Chapters in Kentucky, Michigan, and Ohio.
Gulf Coast Province - Chapters in Alabama, Arkansas, Louisiana, Mississippi, and Tennessee.
Mid-America Province - Chapters in Illinois, Indiana, Kansas, and Missouri.
Mountain East Province - Chapters in the District of Columbia, Maryland, New York, Pennsylvania, Virginia, and West Virginia.
Northeast Province - Chapters in Connecticut, Maine, Massachusetts, New Hampshire, New Jersey, New York, Pennsylvania, New Hampshire, Rhode Island, and Vermont.
Northern Plains Province - Chapters in Iowa, Minnesota, Nebraska, North Dakota, South Dakota, and Wisconsin.
Northwest Province - Chapters in Alaska, British Columbia, Canada, Idaho, Montana, Oregon, Utah, Washington, and Wyoming.
Pacific West Province - Chapters in Arizona, California, Hawaii, and Nevada.
Southeast Province - Chapters in the Bahamas, Florida, Georgia, and South Carolina.
Southwest Province - Chapters in Colorado, New Mexico, Oklahoma, and Texas.

International officers
At the 60th Grand Council Convention held in Phoenix, AZ in July 2022, the following Brothers were elected as international officers of the Fraternity:

The office of Executive Director is appointed by the International Executive Committee.

List of chapters 
 Kappa Psi consists of 111 collegiate and 75 graduate chapters organized into 11 regional provinces.

Active collegiate chapters
The active collegiate chapters are:

Active graduate chapters

Ada Graduate
Albany Graduate
Anaheim Graduate
Arizona Graduate
Athens Graduate
Atlanta Graduate
Auburn Graduate
Boston Graduate
Buffalo Graduate
Buies Creek Graduate
Central Michigan Graduate
Charleston Graduate
Charlotte Graduate
Cincinnati Graduate
Cleveland Graduate
Columbus Graduate
Connecticut Graduate
Dallas Fort Worth Graduate
Denver Graduate
Detroit Graduate
District of Columbia Graduate
Gainesville Graduate
Georgia Graduate
Harrisburg Graduate
Hawaii Graduate
Houston Graduate
Idaho Graduate
Illinois Graduate
Indiana Graduate
Iowa Graduate
Jacksonville Graduate
Kansas City Graduate
Kentucky Graduate
Laurel Highlands Graduate
Los Angeles Graduate
Louisiana Graduate
Maine Graduate
Maryland Graduate
Maryland Eastern Shore Graduate
Minnesota Graduate
Montana Graduate
Nebraska Graduate
Nevada Graduate
New York Graduate
North Carolina Graduate
North Dakota Graduate
Northern Virginia Graduate
Orlando Graduate
Pacific Graduate
Palouse Graduate
Pittsburgh Graduate
Pocono Graduate
Pomona Graduate
Portland Graduate
Providence Graduate
Saint Louis Graduate
San Antonio Graduate
San Diego Graduate
San Francisco Graduate
Savannah Graduate
Seattle Graduate
South Carolina Graduate
South Carolina Upstate Graduate
South Dakota Graduate
Southeast Florida-Bahamas Graduate
Southwestern Graduate
Tampa Graduate
Tennessee Graduate
Texas Graduate
Toledo Graduate
Utah Graduate
Vancouver Graduate
Virginia Graduate
West Virginia Graduate
Wisconsin Graduate

Dormant collegiate chapters
These are dormant chapters at schools of pharmacy, and the school is still active. Note that the early Beta chapter and the three early college preparatory chapters all went to Theta Kappa Psi by agreement.

Discontinued collegiate pharmacy chapters
These chapters at schools of pharmacy where the pharmacy school no longer exists.

Dormant graduate chapters

Grand Council Convention
Kappa Psi holds its international convention biennially. The 61st Grand Council Convention will be held at the Cleveland Renaissance Hotel July 24-28, 2024.

Below is a list of the Grand Council Conventions (along with the year, location, and number of attendees) dating back to the first Grand Council Convention in 1900 in New York City.

 The 22nd and 23rd Grand Council Conventions were postponed due to WWII.
 The 1932 (18th), 1936 (19th), and 1940 (20th) Grand Council Conventions were cancelled.
 The 15th and 16th Grand Council Conventions were held in three separate regional locations with the same business discussed at each.
 The 60th Grand Council Convention was delayed 1 year due (from 2021 to 2022) due to the global coronavirus pandemic.

See also
 Professional fraternities and sororities
 Rho Chi, co-ed, pharmacy honor society

References

Student organizations established in 1879
Professional pharmaceutical fraternities and sororities in the United States
Professional Fraternity Association
1879 establishments in Connecticut